Albatross Marine (1949–1966) was a British manufacturer of very light aluminium speedboats primarily used for Water skiing on lakes. The company was created by two English engineers, Peter Hives (son of the Rolls-Royce Limited director of that time, Lord Hives), and Archie Peace (an aeronautics engineer trained up by the Bristol Aeroplane Company), in St. Olaves (Great Yarmouth, England).

By applying the techniques they knew, and using the after-war surplus of aluminium, they created the first Albatross Mk1 runabout in 1949.

Names of owners included Stirling Moss, Brigitte Bardot, George Formby, Prince Rainier of Monaco (owner of six craft), Prince Philip and Jon Pertwee.

Around 1300 Albatross were built, from which 800 two-seaters (715 MkI/2/3), and 267 four-seaters.

Only 164 models were equipped with the Coventry Climax engine, which make them the most valuable ones today, because of their higher power output.

Sports Runabout 
The Sports Runabout model was a 2-seater speedboat, 12 ft 9 inch long powered by a marinised Ford Prefect engine of 1172cc. It could reach speeds of 30.5 mph.

The Mark I version had a single carburettor, and the Mark II had twin carburetters for extra power.

The Mark II, serial No 135 through to 242, and fitted with an E93A

The Mark III model was a 2-seater speedboat, fitted with Ford 100E engines.

A Series
The A Series model was a 2-seater speedboat, fitted with Ford1500 pre crossflow  or Coventry Climax engines. The Coventry Climax engined boats could reach 47 mph.

A Continental variant, an example of which is located in the National Maritime Museum Cornwall,  was a 4-seater version of the 2 seater speedboat, again fitted with Ford 100e mk1 1500 pre crossflow mk2  or Coventry Climax engines depending on which model above it was based upon.

Alpine
The Albatross Alpine is probably the rarest as only around 30 were made. Most were 4-seaters but a handful of 2-seaters were also built and these were alternatively called Corsairs. All resemble the other 4-seat and 2-seat models with the major difference of having a slipper stern and steering wheel on the left of the cockpit so that the weight of the driver counterbalanced the rotation of the engine which was opposite to all other Albatross boats. (The engine power take-off was at the rear of the engine, not at the "front" of a reversed engine.) The 4-seaters also have an additional hump in the engine cover to accommodate the Sunbeam engine.

While most were fitted with a 1,592cc 4-cylinder Sunbeam engine, the first Corsair was first of all fitted with a Mercedes engine that was not a success. There was also a trial of a climax FPF 2.0L in a four seater. The Sunbeam Alpine Marine engines can be recognised by having twin Zenith carburettors although the first engine was fitted with su carbs. The water tank is found on the top of the engine in the four seater and behind the seat in the Corsair
 
The prototype has hull number 2000 and the highest hull number so far found is 2026. Of these around a dozen have so far been found of which just three are 2-seaters.

References 

http://www.albatrossmarine.co.uk

External links 
http://www.albatrossmarine.co.uk 
http://www.shamwerks.com/albatross_eng.php

British boat builders